The 2010 Toray Pan Pacific Open was a women's tennis tournament played on outdoor hard courts. It was the 27th edition of the Toray Pan Pacific Open, and was part of the Premier Series of the 2010 WTA Tour. It took place at the Ariake Coliseum in Tokyo, Japan, from September 26 through October 2, 2010. Caroline Wozniacki won the singles title.

Champions

Singles

 Caroline Wozniacki defeated  Elena Dementieva, 1–6, 6–2, 6–3
 This is Wozniacki's fifth title of the year and 11th of her career.

Doubles

 Iveta Benešová /  Barbora Záhlavová-Strýcová defeated  Shahar Pe'er /  Peng Shuai, 6–4, 4–6, [10–8]

WTA entrants

Seeds

 Seeds are based on the rankings of September 20, 2010.

Other entrants
The following players received wildcards into the singles main draw:
  Kimiko Date-Krumm
  Ayumi Morita
  Kurumi Nara

The following players received entry from the qualifying draw:
  Gréta Arn
  Iveta Benešová
  Chang Kai-chen
  Ekaterina Makarova
  Christina McHale
  Laura Robson
  Coco Vandeweghe
  Roberta Vinci

The following player received entry by a lucky loser spot:
  María José Martínez Sánchez

Notable withdrawals
  Li Na
  Serena Williams
  Zheng Jie

External links
Official website

Toray Pan Pacific Open
Pan Pacific Open
Toray Pan Pacific Open
Toray Pan Pacific Open
Toray Pan Pacific Open
Toray Pan Pacific Open